Fatehpur  is a village in fatehpur bhullowala of Punjab State, India. The village is administrated by a Sarpanch, who is an elected representative.

Demography 
According to the report published by Census India in 2011, Fatehpur has a total number of 69 houses and population of 409 of which include 213 males and 196 females. Literacy rate of Fatehpur is  67.89%, lower than state average of 75.84%. The population of children under the age of 6 years is 54 which is 13.20% of total population of Fatehpur, and child sex ratio is approximately  636, lower than state average of 846.

As per census 2011, 208 people were engaged in work activities out of the total population of Fatehpur which includes 115 males and 93 females. According to census survey report 2011, 97.12% workers describe their work as main work and 2.88% workers are involved in Marginal activity providing livelihood for less than 6 months.

Population data

Caste  
The village has schedule caste (SC) constitutes 71.64% of total population of the village and it doesn't have any Schedule Tribe (ST) population.

Air travel connectivity 
The closest airport to the village is Sri Guru Ram Dass Jee International Airport.

Villages in Kapurthala

External links
  Villages in Kapurthala
 Kapurthala Villages List

References

Villages in Kapurthala district